Madras Rajagopalan Radhakrishnan (14 April 1907 – 17 September 1979) was an Indian actor and politician active in Tamil plays and films. He was given the title "Nadigavel" (King of acting) by Periyar E. V. Ramasamy. He mostly played villain roles, but had also acted in several films as comedian.

Career 
Madras Rajagopalan Radhakrishna was born on 14 April 1907 at Chintadripet, a locality in Chennai (then Madras), Tamil Nadu. Radha left his home at an early age due to a quarrel with his mother in which she declined to give an extra piece of fish to eat.

Radha was a popular theatre artiste who performed in more than 5000 stage shows. Starting at the age of 10, he appeared at first in small roles and eventually grew to a level that stories for dramas were custom-made for him.

Radha gained popularity with the success of his stage play Ratha Kanneer. His performance in the 1954 film version of the play, directed by Krishnan–Panju, brought wider recognition of his talents and made him a household name in Tamil Nadu.

Radha played both villain roles and comedic roles. In the 1960s, roles were specially written for him, and he often overshadowed actors like MGR and Sivaji Ganesan.

M. G. Ramachandran shooting incident 
On 12 January 1967, Radha and producer K.N. Vasu of Muthukumaran Pictures visited the actor and politician M. G. Ramachandran at his home to talk about a future project. During the conversation, Radha suddenly got up from his chair and shot twice at Ramachandran's left ear. Both bullets got lodged in Ramachandran's neck. Radha then turned the gun on himself and tried to shoot himself, but the bullet just scratched his right temple. Radha and Ramachandran were admitted to the Government General Hospital, Chennai, where they survived after proper treatment. The only eyewitness for the shooting was Vasu.

In the assassination trial, held at Saithapet First Division Magistrate Court under Magistrate S. Kuppusami in May 1967, and later at the Chingleput Sessions Court held under Justice P. Lakshmanan, Radha was represented by eminent criminal attorney N. T. Vanamamalai. The verdict was delivered on 4 November 1967. As majority of the evidences were against Radha, he was sentenced to a seven-year term. At the High Court hearing, considering his age, the sentence was reduced to four years and three months.

Death 
Radha died of jaundice on 17 September 1979 aged 72 at his residence in Tiruchirappalli.

Personal life 
Radha married four times, and his marriages were concurrent. The names of his wives were Saraswathi, Dhanalakshmi, Jaya and Geetha.

Radhakrishnan was the father of several children by his four wives. His three sons were M. R. R. Vasu, M. R. Radha Ravi and M.R. Radharajoo. Radhakrishnan also had seven daughters, including Rashya, Rani and Rathi born to Dhanalakshmi, Ganavalli, Kasturi, Rajeswari born to Jaya and two daughters (actresses Raadhika and Nirosha) born to Geetha.

His first son Vasu was a leading character artist until the mid-1980s. His other son Radha Ravi is also an actor. Radhika is an actress and producer and is married to actor R. Sarathkumar. Nirosha (also known as Niroja) is an actress working mostly in supporting roles; she is married to actor Ramki.

Filmography 
This is a partial filmography. You can expand it.

1930s

1940s

1950s

1960s

1970s

1980s

References

External links 
 

Indian male film actors
Tamil male actors
Dravidian movement
Anti-Brahminism
1907 births
1979 deaths
Indian male stage actors
20th-century Indian male actors
Male actors in Tamil cinema
Periyarists
Male actors from Chennai